The Nith River is a river in Brant, Oxford and Perth Counties and the Regional Municipality of Waterloo in Southwestern Ontario, Canada. The Nith River is approximately 125km in length and empties into the Grand River at the town of Paris.  It is named after the River Nith in Scotland.

Course
The Nith river begins in a woodland northwest of Crosshill and west of Waterloo Regional Road 5 in the township of Wellesley, Region of Waterloo. It heads north into Perth County, then turns sharply southwest and passes through the communities of Fernbank and Millbank in Perth East. It continues south, takes in the right tributary Smith Creek and arrives at the community of Nithburg. The river flows east back into Waterloo Region, takes in the right tributary Silver Creek, and then the left tributary Firella Creek south of the community of Wellesley in the township of Wellesley. The river turns south into the township of Wilmot, takes in the left tributary Bamberg Creek and passes through the communities of Phillipsburg and New Hamburg, Ontario. The Nith continues south, takes in the left tributaries Baden Creek and Hunsburger Creek, enters into Blandford-Blenheim, Oxford County and reaches the community of Plattsville. The river turns east, takes in the right tributary Black Creek, and left tributaries Hiller Creek, Alder Creek and Eden Creek, passes back into Waterloo Region, and reaches the community of Ayr in the township of North Dumfries, where it takes in the left tributary Cedar Creek. It then turns sharply west, flows back into Oxford County, then turns southeast passing through the communities of Wolverton and Canning. The Nith then flows into Brant County, takes in the right tributary Mud Creek and left tributary Charlie Creek, passing Barker's Bush and reaching its mouth at the Grand River in Paris.

Recreation 
The Nith River is flat water with a few riffles, but rain and snowmelt can significantly increase the flow rate. In the early spring the maximum flow rate reaches a median value of 30 and mean of 40, but commonly exceeds 200 m3/s, causing major flooding in the flat regions upstream such as in and around New Hamburg. The Nith offers excellent paddling conditions in April, including a set of Class III whitewater rapids as the Nith enters Paris, yet by May, the flow rate drops below 5 m3/s and becomes unsuitable for paddling.

The river is under the auspices of the Grand River Conservation Authority.

Wayne Gretzky stated on the April 26, 2022 episode of the podcast Spittin' Chiclets that the first time he ice skated was at 2 1/2 years-old on the frozen Nith River in his grandfolks' back yard.

Tributaries
Charlie Creek (left)
Mud Creek (right)
Cedar Creek (left)
Eden Creek (left)
Alder Creek (left)
Hiller Creek (left)
Black Creek (right)
Hunsburger Creek (left)
Baden Creek (left)
Bamberg Creek (left)
Firella Creek (left)
Silver Creek (right)
Smith Creek (right)

See also

List of rivers of Ontario

References

External links

Rivers of Perth County, Ontario
Landforms of the County of Brant
Landforms of Oxford County, Ontario
Rivers of the Regional Municipality of Waterloo
North Dumfries
Tributaries of the Grand River (Ontario)